The Palm Treo 700p was a cell phone with advanced capabilities, commonly referred to as a  smartphone.  Unlike the slightly earlier Treo 700w, this model is based on Palm OS.  This is the first Palm OS-based Treo model to feature high-speed cellular network support, and is also the first Treo model to support Bluetooth 1.2.

While its specifications were more advanced than those of its predecessors, the Treo 700p shares an almost identical form factor with its closest relative, the Palm Treo 650.  The Treo 700p was one of four Treo smartphones released in 2006.

The Treo 700p is faster than the Treo 650, and like the 650, it is able to play video from downloads using third-party software such as TCPMP. The 700p by virtue of its EVDO capability can also play live streaming video including cable TV stations.  The Treo 700p was offered on Sprint and Verizon Wireless in the United States.  With the release of a Palm OS client for Slingbox, Verizon and Sprint customers had the ability to watch live TV on their 700p's via a Slingbox set up in the subscriber's home. With appropriate service, it can also display the latest news and headlines in an on-demand user area.

Carriers
The Treo 700 was available in the US through Sprint Nextel, Verizon Wireless, and Alltel. In Canada, it was available from Telus Mobility.

Specifications
 Operating System: Palm OS 5.4.9
 Storage: 128 MB (60 user-accessible) Non-Volatile File System RAM
 Processor: Intel XScale 312 MHz
 Screen: 320 by 320 Color 2x2 in. TFT, 65,536 Colors
 External ringer on/off switch w/vibrate mode
 Wireless Antenna: 
 CDMA 800/1900 MHz digital dual-band
 CDMA2000 EvDO Rev 0, backwards compatible with 1xRTT and IS-95 networks
 Bluetooth 1.2
 Camera: 1.3 Megapixel, 1280x1024 resolution, 2X digital zoom, automatic light balance
 Audio: 2.5 mm stereo headphone jack, compatible with wireless headsets using Bluetooth connectivity
 Input: Touchscreen, QWERTY thumb keyboard with integrated number dial pad
 Personal speakerphone
 Microphone mute option
 TTY/TDD compatibility
 3-way calling
 Support for MultiMediaCard, SDIO, and SD cards. Palm says the device supports SD cards up to 2 GB out of the box; but Palm has released a firmware update which provides support for larger SDHC cards.
 Removable, 1800 mAh rechargeable lithium-ion battery
 Talk time up to 4.5 hours, standby time up to 300 hours
 Size 2.28" W x 5.08" H (excluding antenna) x 0.89" D; 58 mm W x 129 mm H x 23 mm D
 Weight 6.4 ounces; 180 grams

However, the phone has been described by some sources as being more “evolutionary than revolutionary” – e.g. the phone is a substantial improvement over the Treo 600 and 650 models but it does not offer new capabilities that would make the Treo 700p a quantum improvement over these and other products.  The phone is also certainly not a perfect product, with many reviewers citing the following issues:

The phone still lacks Wi-Fi capability.
Palm OS 5.4.9, although quite stable, appears a bit dated when compared to Window's Mobile graphics and does not offer multitasking. Limited multitasking includes MP3 playback, background email synchronization and the usual telephony functions. One unusual multitasking capability is the ability to send and receive SMS easily while on a phone call.
The phone does have voice dialing capability, but it is not accessible through a Bluetooth headset or other devices.
A GSM version is unavailable, thus overseas roaming is somewhat restricted but available in countries that use the CDMA standard. Treo 650 (older) and Treo 680 (newer) are the nearest equivalents to a GSM version of 700p.

As of July 1, 2008, the phone is no longer listed for sale on the Palm site.

See also
 Treo 680
 Palm Treo smartphones

External links
 Palm: Treo 700p
 User manual for Sprint version (PDF)
 Palm Infocenter Treo 700p Review
 CNET Review of Treo 700p

References

Palm OS devices
Palm mobile phones
Palm Treo 700p